ØØ Void (pronounced in interviews as "double-O void") is the first studio album by Sunn O))). The album was recorded on 24 track 2" tape at Grandmaster Studios in Hollywood, a large step forward in production values from the band's demo recording The Grimmrobe Demos.

The third track, "Rabbits' Revenge", is an interpretation of an obscure Melvins' song that was only played live during their early years. A sample of a live performance of the original song can be heard past the five minute mark.

The album was originally released in 2000, by Hydra Head in the USA, and by Rise Above in Europe and the United Kingdom. In 2008, ØØ Void was reissued and released in Japan only, through the Japanese record label Daymare Recordings. The reissue was a two-disc set, with the first disc containing all of the original tracks from ØØ Void and the second disc containing a collaboration between Sunn O))) and the experimental/industrial group Nurse with Wound. The album was re-released in the original single-disc format in 2011 by Southern Lord Recordings, with new album artwork by Stephen Kasner.

Track listing

Bonus disc

Guest musicians

 Petra Haden  –  violin, vocals
 Scott Reeder  –  bass guitar
 Pete Stahl  –  vocals

References

External links
 Review by Pitchfork: http://pitchfork.com/reviews/albums/16130-void-the-iron-soul-of-nothing/
 Review by AMG: http://www.allmusic.com/album/%C3%C3-void-mw0000463967
 RateYourMusic page: https://rateyourmusic.com/release/album/sunn_o___/oo_void/
 Press release by Southern Lord Recordings: http://www.southernlord.com/press/sunn00void/

2000 debut albums
Sunn O))) albums
Rise Above Records albums
Hydra Head Records albums
Southern Lord Records albums